Gateway Playhouse, also known as the Performing Arts Center of Suffolk County is a theatre located on the eastern edge of Bellport, New York on the grounds of the former Mott Estate. The street address is 215 South Country Road.  It's the oldest of three professional theatres on the island and nationally recognized as one of the top ten summer theatres in the nation.

History
The theater's history dates to 1950 with a production of Taming of the Shrew in a converted barn as was traditional of the time. By the 1960s it transitioned from summer stock to a professional company with a new theater that seated five hundred. In 2011, the Gateway Playhouse and Acting School combined to form the non-profit organization, the Performing Arts Center of Suffolk County.

Among its notable productions are a 1992 production of Once on This Island with Norm Lewis, as well as a 2011 production of Sunset Boulevard and a 2016 production of Anything Goes with Andrea McArdle.

In fall, the theater transforms into a haunted house.

References

External links

Brookhaven, New York
Theatres in New York (state)
Tourist attractions in Suffolk County, New York
Buildings and structures in Suffolk County, New York